Low Franconian, Low Frankish, Netherlandic is a linguistic category used to classify a number of historical and contemporary West Germanic varieties closely related to, and including, the Dutch language. Most dialects and languages included within the category are spoken in the Netherlands, northern Belgium (Flanders), in the Nord department of France, in western Germany (Lower Rhine), as well as in Suriname, South Africa and Namibia.

Terminology 

The term Frankish or Franconian as a modern linguistic category was coined by the German linguist Wilhelm Braune (1850–1926). He divided Franconian which contained both Germanic dialects which had and had not experienced the Second Germanic consonant shift into Low, Middle and High Franconian, with the use of Low signifying that this category did not participate in the sound shift.

Low Frankish is a purely linguistic category and isn't used as a term of self-designation among any of the speakers of the Germanic dialects traditionally grouped within it.

Within the field of historical philology the terminology for the historical phases of Low Franconian is not analogous to the traditional Old High German / Middle High German and Old Low German / Middle Low German dichotomies, with the terms Old Dutch and Middle Dutch commonly being preferred to Old Low Franconian and Middle Low Franconian in most contexts. Due to the category's strong interconnection with the Dutch language and its historical forms, Low Franconian is occasionally used interchangeably with Dutch, though the latter term can have a broader as well as narrower meaning depending on the specific context. English publications alternatively use Netherlandic as a synonym of Low Franconian, thereby signifying the category's close relation to Dutch, without using it as a synonym.

Historically, Low Franconian was sometimes grouped together with Low Saxon, referred to as Low German. However, since this grouping is not based on common linguistic innovations, but rather on the absence of the High German consonant shift, modern linguistic reference books do not group them together.

Origins 

Despite the name, the diachronical connection to Old Frankish, the unattested language spoken by the Franks, is unclear for most of the varieties grouped under the broad "Franconian" category, mainly due to the heavy influence of Elbe Germanic / High German-features on the Middle and High Franconian varieties following the Migration Period. The dialects of the Low Franconian grouping form an exception to this, with the dialects generally being accepted to be the most direct descendants of Old Frankish. As such, Old Dutch and Middle Dutch, together with loanwords in Old French, are the principal languages used to reconstruct Old Frankish using the comparative method. Within historical linguistics Old Low Franconian is synonymous with Old Dutch.
 Depending on the author, the temporal boundary between Old Dutch and Old Frankish is either defined by the onset of the Second Germanic consonant shift in Eastern Frankish, the assimilation of an unattested coastal dialect showing North Sea Germanic-features by West Frankish during the closing of the 9th century, or a combination of both. Some linguists use the terms Old Low Franconian or West Frankish to specifically refer to the, very sparsely attested, varieties of Old Dutch spoken prior its assimilation of the coastal dialect.

Old Dutch is divided into Old West Dutch and Old East Dutch, with the descendants of Old West Dutch forming the dominant basis of the Middle Dutch literary language and Old East Dutch forming a noticeable substrate within the dialects of Limburgish.

Modern classification  
Low Franconian / Netherlandic
Dutch
 Brabantian
 West Flemish
 East Flemish
 Central Dutch
 Hollandic
 South Guelderish (also called Kleverlandish or Clevian)
 Zeelandic
Limburgish

There are sources to include and Southeast Limburgish / Low Dietsch which would be classified as an East-Low Franconian variety equal to Limburgish or a further subdivision thereof.

The Dutch standard language, being based primarily on Flemish, Brabantian and Hollandic dialects, has had a considerable influence on West Frisian dialects and Low Saxon dialects spoken in the Netherlands, as well as the East Frisian dialects of Germany; to the effect of creating significant substrate interference in these varieties.

Area loss
Until the Early Modern Period all speakers of varieties of Low Franconian used Middle Dutch or Early Modern Dutch as their literary language and Dachsprache. A marked change occurred in the 19th century, when the traditionally Dutch-speaking region of French Flanders experienced a period of Francization under the auspices of the French government. A similar process took place in the Lower Rhine region, then part of Prussia, where extensive Germanisation also took place and public and official use of the Dutch language was forbidden leading to a decline in the use of Dutch and Limburgish. In addition, the historically Dutch-speaking Brussels Capital Region is officially bilingual, but now largely francophone.

See also 
 Afrikaans
 Dutch dialects
 Franconian languages
 Istvaeones
 History of Dutch
 Middle Dutch

Notes

Further reading
 Euler, Wolfram (2013). Das Westgermanische – von der Herausbildung im 3. bis zur Aufgliederung im 7. Jahrhundert – Analyse und Rekonstruktion (West Germanic: from its Emergence in the 3rd up until its Dissolution in the 7th century CE: Analyses and Reconstruction). 244 p., in German with English summary, Verlag Inspiration Un Limited, London/Berlin 2013, .
 Maurer, Friedrich (1942), Nordgermanen und Alemannen:  Studien zur germanischen und frühdeutschen Sprachgeschichte, Stammes- und Volkskunde, Strasbourg:  Hünenburg.

 
Frankish people